Buckingham is a market town in north Buckinghamshire, England, close to the borders of Northamptonshire and Oxfordshire, which had a population of 12,890 at the 2011 Census.

Buckingham was the county town of Buckinghamshire from the 10th century, when it was made the capital of the newly formed shire of Buckingham, until Aylesbury took over this role in the 18th century.

Buckingham has a variety of restaurants and pubs, typical of a market town. It has a number of local shops, both national and independent. Market days are Tuesday and Saturday which take over Market Hill and the High Street cattle pens. Buckingham is twinned with Neukirchen-Vluyn, Germany and Mouvaux, France.

History 
Buckingham and the surrounding area has been settled for some time with evidence of Roman settlement found in several sites close the River Great Ouse, including a temple south of the A421 at Bourton Grounds which was excavated in the 1960s and dated to the 3rd century AD. A possible Roman building was identified at Castle Fields in the 19th century. Pottery, kiln furniture and areas of burning found at Buckingham industrial estate suggest the site of some early Roman pottery kilns here.

In the 7th century, Buckingham, literally "meadow of Bucca's people" is said to have been founded by Bucca, the leader of the first Anglo Saxon settlers. The first settlement was located around the top of a loop in the River Great Ouse, presently the Hunter Street campus of the University of Buckingham. Between the 7th century and the 11th century, the town of Buckingham regularly changed hands between the Saxons and the Danes, in particular, in 914 King Edward the Elder and a Saxon army encamped in Buckingham for four weeks forcing local Danish Viking leaders to surrender. Subsequently, a fort was constructed at the location of the present Buckingham parish church. Buckingham is mentioned in the Burghal Hidage, a document commonly ascribed to the early tenth century, but more probably of the period 878–9, which describes a system of forts set up by King Alfred (d.899) over the whole of the West Saxon kingdom.  When King Edward encamped at Buckingham with his army in 914, he was therefore restoring a fort which had already existed for more than a generation.  This tactical move was part of a putsch against the Danish Vikings who controlled what had been southern Mercia, and which involved the taking of control of Viking centres at Bedford, Northampton, Cambridge and eventually the whole of East Anglia by the end of 917.

Buckingham is the first settlement referred to in the Buckinghamshire section of the Domesday Book of 1086. Buckingham was referred to as Buckingham with Bourton, and the survey makes reference to 26 burgesses, 11 smallholders and 1 mill.

The town received its charter in 1554 when Queen Mary created the free Borough of Buckingham with boundaries extending from Thornborowe Bridge (now Thornborough) to Dudley Bridge and from Chackmore Bridge to Padbury Mill Bridge. The designated borough included a bailiff, twelve principal burgesses and a steward. Yeomanry House, the offices and home of the commanding officer of the Buckinghamshire Yeomanry, was built in the early 19th century.

The town suffered from a significant fire that raged through the town centre on 15 March 1725, with the result that many of the main streets of the town were destroyed including Castle Street, Castle Hill and the north side of Market Hill. The result was 138 dwellings (out of a total of 387 in the town at that time) being consumed in the fire. The current fine range of Georgian architecture in these streets today is as a direct result of that fire, but the immediate aftermath was difficult for the town. Collections were made in surrounding towns such as Aylesbury and Wendover to help those made homeless and by 1730, only a third of the homes had been rebuilt.  Due to many buildings being considered to be of historic interest, a number of them have been granted 'listed building' status. These include the Grade I listed Castle House on West Street, which dates back to the 15th century. Buckingham Town Hall, which is Grade II* listed, dates back to the late 18th century.

The town was connected to the London and North Western Railway by the Buckinghamshire Railway in 1850.

The municipal borough had a population of 1,816 in 1841.

In 1971, Buckinghamshire County Council set up the Buckingham Development Company with other local councils, and undertook a significant project to grow the town and provide a bypass, mainly to the south and east of the historic town centre. The population rose from just over 5,000 to 9,309 in 1991.

Saint Rumbold 

The town is said to be the final resting place of St Rumbold (also known as Saint Rumwold), a little-known Saxon saint and the grandson of Penda King of Mercia; the parish church at Strixton (Northamptonshire) is dedicated to him and the small northern town of Romaldkirk is also thought to be named after him. He was apparently born at King's Sutton, Northants, where he died just three days later. During his short life, he repeatedly professed his Christian faith and asked for baptism. He is now most often referred to as St Rumbold,
the latter being the most common, as it can be found being used on a local road name and recent booklets about the subject.

Geography 

The town is centred on the historic market place and contains many 18th century buildings. There are three main roads crossing Buckingham, namely the A413, the A421 (the southern bypass) and the A422. Capability Brown's historic formal garden design at Stowe (on the A422 westbound) is an important attraction in the care of the National Trust.

There is a medieval well known as St Rumbold's Well on the south side of the dismantled railway which borders the town. The well, which is now dry for much of the year, was positioned to exploit the spring line below the crest of a north facing slope overlooking the town.

Suburbs of Buckingham include Mount Pleasant, Page Hill, Bourton, Badgers, Linden Village, Castle Fields and Lace Hill. Maids Moreton, a village on the north eastern borders of the town has become contiguous with the Buckingham urban area. Nearby settlements include Aylesbury, Winslow, Bicester, Brackley, Milton Keynes and Towcester. Local villages in the immediate vicinity include Padbury and Gawcott to the south, Chackmore to the north and Shalstone to the north west. It is also very near Stowe, the location of Stowe House, Stowe Gardens and Stowe School.

There is a degree confluence point on the edge of the town, at exactly .

Bourton 
Bourton was a hamlet in the parish of Buckingham. The hamlet name is Old English in origin, and means 'fortified enclosure'. It is now an integral part of the town of Buckingham, with a road and old mill named Bourton still visible to visitors.

Bourton was once the location of a great house that belonged to the Minshull family. In the English Civil War the house was plundered by Parliamentarian forces.   The house has long since disappeared.

Population
At the 2011 Census, the population of the Buckingham built-up area, which includes Maids Moreton but excludes Lace Hill, was 12,890. The population of the Buckingham civil parish (which excludes Maids Moreton but includes Lace Hill) was 12,043. The town has continued to grow since 2011 and thus the figures at the prospective 2021 Census are expected to be significantly greater. , the Town Council estimates the population of its civil parish at 15,000.

Education 
The town is home to the University of Buckingham, the oldest of the UK's five private universities. Like other UK universities, a large proportion of its students are from overseas.

The Buckinghamshire Council operates the Tripartite System of state secondary education. The local state secondary schools are the Royal Latin School (a Grammar School) and the Buckingham School (a secondary modern). Stowe School and Akeley Wood School, just outside the town, are private schools.

There are four primary schools, one a community school and the other three academies, serving different areas of the town: Buckingham Primary School is the community primary, and the three academies (Bourton Meadow Academy, George Grenville Academy and Lace Hill Academy) are all operated by Campfire Education Trust.

Industry and business 
The town is home to a number of industrial estates and technology parks housing high tech companies in the pharmaceutical, electronic, foods and composite materials fields, including Racelogic and Wipac.

Buckingham was home to the Thomas Rickett steam car, an innovative vehicle from 1860, though considered ahead of its time and only two are thought to have been made.

Most retail is located in the town centre with a variety of independent stores, cafes and restaurants as well as national chains. The Hidden Quarter, located mainly in Well Street and Bridge Street, hosts a number of independent retailers selling everything from handmade home wares to retro wooden toys. Currently, there are two banks in the town centre - Barclays and Lloyds.

Town markets 

Buckingham's historic street market has been in the town for over 600 years and dates from the Charters granted by Queen Mary in 1554 and Charles II in 1664, giving the markets a unique heritage.

Street markets are held every Tuesday and Saturday. Regular and casual market traders offer a wide variety of products, including fish, fruit and veg, award-winning bread, household goods, tools, flowers and clothes. There is a flea market held every Saturday on the site of the town's former cattle pens, offering a wide selection of antiques, collectables and jewellery.

Governance

There are two tiers of local government in Buckingham, at parish (town) and unitary authority level: Buckingham Town Council and Buckinghamshire Council. The town council is based at the Buckingham Centre on Verney Close in the town.

Historically, Buckingham was an ancient borough, and it became a municipal borough in 1836. Buckingham Borough Council was based at Buckingham Town Hall until 1965, when it moved to Castle House on West Street. The borough was abolished in 1974 to become part of Aylesbury Vale district, with Buckingham Town Council being established as a successor parish covering the former borough. Aylesbury Vale District Council in turn was abolished in 2020, merging with Buckinghamshire County Council and the county's other districts to become Buckinghamshire Council.

Transport

Road 
Buckingham stands at the crossroads of the A413 (north-south), A421 and A422 (east-west) roads. The town was by-passed in the early 1980s by creating a new section of the A421 to the south.

Bus 
Buckingham is linked to Milton Keynes, Winslow and Aylesbury by the regular X60 bus. An inter-city coach service, the X5, links the town to both Cambridge (via Bedford) and Oxford (via Bicester). Some surrounding villages are connected to Buckingham by a market day bus and there is a community bus scheme called Bart.

Canal 
Buckingham was served by the Buckingham Arm of the Grand Junction Canal from 1801 until the end of the 19th century. In 1928, the Grand Junction Canal Company offered to re-open the canal if a minimum income of tolls could be guaranteed, but this was not forthcoming, with only occasional use reported up to 1932, and the canal was finally abandoned in 1964. The canal ran from Cosgrove, Northamptonshire to the centre of Buckingham to a wharf. A short section of the canal to the east of the town has now been restored.

Rail 
Buckingham had a railway station on the Banbury to Verney Junction Branch Line, which opened in 1850 and closed to passengers in 1964 and freight in 1966. Finmere railway station on the Great Central Main Line was originally called "Finmere for Buckingham" when it opened in 1899, despite being  from Buckingham. Finmere station dropped the "for Buckingham" from its name in the early 1920s, and closed in 1963. The closest stations to Buckingham are now Wolverton and Milton Keynes Central to the east and Bicester North and Bicester Village to the south west. The new East West rail link will have a stop at nearby Winslow, scheduled to start running by the end of 2023.

Leisure and wellbeing

Sport 
There are two local football teams, and a rugby union club including teams for women and young women. These are Buckingham Athletic F.C. based at Stratford Fields, Buckingham United F.C based at Lace Hill and Buckingham RUFC based at Floyd Field, Maids Moreton. Moretonville Junior Football Club also has boys and girls teams from u7s – u16s. The town used to be home to Buckingham Town F.C. founded in 1883 until their relocation to Fenny Stratford in 2019; they played at Ford Meadow from 1883 until being evicted in 2011.

The town also has the Buckingham Town Cricket Club, based at Bourton Road and the Buckingham Hockey Club which plays at Stowe School. Since 2014, Buckingham has been host to a weekly  Parkrun.

The town has several public sports facilities including the Swan Leisure Centre with an indoor swimming pool, climbing wall, an all weather sports pitch, squash courts. There are two bowls pitch and tennis courts managed by clubs and several private golf clubs in the vicinity of the town.

Culture 
Buckingham Old Gaol is the town's museum which was established in 1993 in the historic town centre Old Gaol building. It also houses temporary exhibitions and the Tourist Information Centre.

The Chandos Cinema was in operation from 1934 and closed in 1987, but in 2005 an independent community cinema opened in the university called the Film Place. Live music events are regularly held in the Radcliffe Centre.

A library is located in the town centre, operated by Buckinghamshire County Council.

The town is home to numerous clubs and associations including the Buckingham Society, a civic amenity society linked with Civic Voice, a large U3A with over 900 members, and many music, photography and arts clubs.

The town holds an annual Charter Fair. It is held in October over two successive Saturdays starting on the first Saturday after the 11th of the month. During the 19th century it was called the Statute Fair. The public roasting of an ox, sheep and pig often took place at the same time.

Tourism 

The town's tourist attractions include the Chantry Chapel, the Buckingham Old Gaol museum, the Sir George Gilbert Scott designed St.Peter & St Paul Church and a number of picturesque Georgian streetscapes. Nearby to Buckingham include Stowe School, Stowe Landscape Gardens and Silverstone Circuit.

Buckingham has a number of hotels including the Villiers Hotel and White Hart in the town centre, and Best Western Buckingham Hotel and Travelodge on the outskirts.

Healthcare 
Buckingham is served by one GP surgery (The Swan Practice) and a community hospital. A minor injuries unit at the hospital was closed in 2009 and the nearest major hospital with an accident & emergency department is in Milton Keynes.

Media
The town is served by the Buckingham & Winslow Advertiser weekly newspaper and is within the broadcast area of local independent radio Mix 96, Heart Four Counties (now Heart East) and the BBC Three Counties Radio stations. The town sits between two television transmitters, with residents able to choose between ITV Anglia/BBC East and ITV Meridian/BBC South.

Places of worship 
 St Bernardine's Catholic Church, Buckingham
 Buckingham Evangelical Church
 St Peter and St Paul, Buckingham (Church of England)
 The Salvation Army
 Well Street United Church, Buckingham (Methodist, Baptist and United Reformed Church)

Notable people 
 George Baldock (footballer), who attended the Royal Latin School
 Sam Baldock (footballer), who attended the Royal Latin School
 Bill Benyon elected Member of Parliament for Buckingham 1970-83 
 John Bercow Speaker of the House of Commons
 Gillian Blake (actress)
 Wyndham Hazelton (cricketer)
 Dan Jones (writer) attended the Royal Latin School
 Frank Markham, elected member of parliament for Buckingham 1951–64
 Bernie Marsden (guitarist/songwriter with rock band Whitesnake) was born in Buckingham
 Robert Maxwell, businessman and member of Parliament for Buckingham, 1964–1970
 Shan Morgan, a civil servant who attended the Royal Latin School
 Prince Philippe, Count of Paris, an exiled claimant to the French throne, leased Stowe
 Craig Pickering (athlete), attended the Royal Latin School
 David Pickering (writer) reference books compiler
 Mary Pix (1666 – 1709), novelist and playwright
 George Gilbert Scott (architect)
 Anthony Seldon, vice-chancellor of the University of Buckingham
 Richard Temple-Nugent-Brydges-Chandos-Grenville, 2nd Duke of Buckingham and Chandos, born at Stowe
 Browne Willis, a member of Parliament for Buckingham 1705–1708

Twin towns
Buckingham has been twinned with Joinville, in France, since 1963.

In 2002, Buckingham became twinned with the French town of Mouvaux.

In 2020, Buckingham formalised its links with the German town of Neukirchen-Vluyn, Mouvaux's twin town in Germany, and the three towns (Buckingham, Mouvaux and Neukirch-Vluyn) became officially twinned.

See also 
 Buckingham (borough)
 Buckingham (UK Parliament constituency)
 Buckingham Palace, originally built for the Duke of Buckingham in the City of Westminster (Greater London), is named after this town.
 Buckingham gave its name to Buckingham Township, Bucks County, Pennsylvania
 Duke of Buckingham
 Duchess of Buckingham

Citations

General references 
 .
 .

External links 

 Buckingham official website
 Buckingham Town Council
 Bucks County Council Unlocking Buckinghamshire's Past: Buckingham
 The Buckingham Society
 Buckingham – Mouvaux Twinning Association

 
Civil parishes in Buckinghamshire
Market towns in Buckinghamshire
Populated places on the River Great Ouse
Towns in Buckinghamshire